Private eye or Private Eye may refer to:

 Private investigator, a hired detective
 Private Eye, a British news, investigative and satirical magazine

Film and television
 Private Eyes (1953 film), a film starring The Bowery Boys
 The Private Eyes (1976 film), a Hong Kong film starring Michael Hui
 The Private Eyes (1980 film) a film starring Don Knotts and Tim Conway
 Private Eye (1987 film), a 1987 TV film starring Josh Brolin
 Private Eye (TV series), a 1987–1988 American series based on the film
 Private Eye (film), a 2009 South Korean film
 Private Eyes (TV series), a 2016 Canadian series starring Jason Priestley

Literature
 The Private Eye, a 2013 comics series by Brian K. Vaughan and Marcos Martín
 Private Eyes (play), a 1996 play by Steven Dietz
 "Private Eye", a 1949 short story by Lewis Padgett (Henry Kuttner and C. L. Moore)

Music
 "Private Eye" (song), a 2001 song by Alkaline Trio
 "Private Eye", a song on the album Adultery by Dog Fashion Disco
 Private Eyes (Hall & Oates album), 1981
 "Private Eyes" (song), the title song
 Private Eyes (Tommy Bolin album), 1976

Other uses
 Private Eye (1983 video game), a game from Activision
 Private Eye (1996 video game), a game from Brooklyn Multimedia
 Private Eye Project, an American educational program
 Private Eyes (nightclub), a former nightclub in New York City

See also
 Privatize, to transfer ownership from the public to the private sector